The Brooklyn Heights Railroad was a street railway company in the U.S. state of New York. It leased and operated the streetcar lines of the Brooklyn Rapid Transit Company, but started out with the Montague Street Line, a short cable car line connecting the Wall Street Ferry with downtown Brooklyn along Montague Street. Eliphalet Williams Bliss owned the railroad.

Controlled lines
According to articles in the Brooklyn Daily Eagle, BHRR included the following lines between 1895 and 1899:

B
Bay Ridge Line
Bath Beach and Bensonhurst Line to Ulmer Park
Brighton Beach Line
Bergen Beach Line
Bowery Bay Line
Broadway Line
Broadway and Jamaica Avenue Line
Brooklyn Hills Line
Bushwick-Meeker Line
Bushwick Avenue Line

C
Calvary Cemetery Line
Corona Line
Court Street Line
Crosstown Line
Coney Island and Brighton Beach Line
Cypress Hills Line
Cypress Hills Extension

E
East New York Line

F
Flatbush Avenue Line
Flushing Avenue Line
Forest Park Line
Fort Hamilton Line
Fresh Pond Line
Fulton Street Line
Furman Street Line

G
Gates Avenue Line
Glendale Line
Graham Avenue Line
Grand Street Line
Greene and Gates Avenues Line
Greenpoint Line
Greenpoint Line

H
Hamilton Avenue Line
Holy Cross Cemetery Line

J
Jamaica Line

K
Kingston Avenue Line

L
Lorimer Street Line
Lutheran Cemetery Line

M
Manhattan and Nassau Avenues Line
Meeker Avenue Line
Meeker Street Line
Metropolitan Avenue Line
Montague Street Line
Myrtle Avenue Line

N
Nassau Avenue Line
Nostrand Avenue Line

P  
Putnam Avenue Line
Putnam Avenue and Halsey Street Line

R
Reid Avenue Line
Ralph Avenue Line
Richmond Hill and Jamaica Line
Ridgewood Line

S
Sea Beach Line to Coney Island
Second Avenue Line
Sumner Avenue Line

T
Third Avenue Line to Fort Hamilton and Bensonhurst
Tompkins Avenue Line

U
Union Avenue Line
Utica Avenue Line

The railroad also partially owned the Bridge Operating Company, a line across the Williamsburg Bridge that was also owned by New York Railways.

References 

Streetcar lines in Brooklyn
Predecessors of the Brooklyn–Manhattan Transit Corporation
Defunct New York (state) railroads
Defunct public transport operators in the United States

Railway companies disestablished in 1907
American companies disestablished in 1907